Opération éclipse took place between 2 and 20 January 2021. According to a UN investigation it occasioned the deaths of 19 civilians in the village of Bounti in Mali.

Present forces 
The operation was set at the east of Mopti's region, close to the border with Burkina Faso. The main group that is opposed is Jama'at Nasr al-Islam wal Muslimin. Onto the operation 1500 French men, 900 Burkinabians 900 malian men and 150 Nigerians soldiers are in presence.

Operations 
On the 2 of January several fighters from Jama'at Nasr al-Islam wal Muslimin are killed between Homobori and Boulikessi

3 the 3 of January French army attacks a gathering next to Doentza and Boni:

According to French army, a 40 of djihadist are taken for aim and 30 of them are killed by two bombs dropped from 2 Mirage 2000 jetplanes, along with the presence of  a MQ-9 Reaper. However the Peul association Tabital Pulaaku gives another version: according to it the strikes have made 19 deaths and among them all of them are men and civilians which are mostly aged that came to a wedding. Injured ones are taken into charge by Medicins Sans Frontieres.

The French army maintains its version that is confirmed by Malian Ministry of Defence.

See also
Mali wedding airstrike

References 

Mopti
2020 in Mali
2020 in Burkina Faso
Mali War
Battles in 2021